Armando Dell'Aquila (born 20 August 1987 in Scafati) is an Italian rower.

References
 

1987 births
Living people
Italian male rowers
People from Scafati
World Rowing Championships medalists for Italy
Sportspeople from the Province of Salerno